Nam Phrae is a tambon (subdistrict) of Hang Dong District, in Chiang Mai Province, Thailand. In 2016 it had a population of 6,830 people.

History
The subdistrict was created effective 1 September 1985 by splitting off eight administrative villages from Hang Dong.

Administration

Central administration
The tambon is divided into 11 administrative villages (mubans).

Local administration
The area of the subdistrict is covered by the subdistrict municipality (thesaban tambon) Nam Phrae Phatthana (เทศบาลตำบลน้ำแพร่พัฒนา).

References

External links
Thaitambon.com on Nam Phrae

Tambon of Chiang Mai province
Populated places in Chiang Mai province